Robert Best (12 September 1891 – 8 June 1947) was an English professional footballer who played as a winger for Sunderland.

References

1891 births
1947 deaths
People from Mickley, Northumberland
Footballers from Northumberland
English footballers
Association football wingers
Sunderland A.F.C. players
Wolverhampton Wanderers F.C. players
Durham City A.F.C. players
Hartlepool United F.C. players
Bedlington United A.F.C. players
West Stanley F.C. players
English Football League players